Mikael Kisbye Strøm (born 23 June 1959) is a former Danish handball player who competed in the 1984 Summer Olympics.

He played his club handball with Gladsaxe HG. In 1984 he finished fourth with the Denmark men's national handball team in the 1984 Olympic tournament. He played one match and scored three goals.

References

1959 births
Living people
Danish male handball players
Olympic handball players of Denmark
Handball players at the 1984 Summer Olympics